The Kuzuha International was a professional golf tournament in Japan between 1965 and 1990. It was played at the Kuzuha Public Golf Course in Kuzuha, Hirakata, Osaka. From 1978 to 1983, it was a Japan Golf Tour event.

In 1985, Tsutomu Irie became the first player to break the 60 barrier in major professional tournament in Japan when he scored 59 (11 under par) in the first round.

History
The first two editions were a five-man invitation event played over 18 holes, after which it was a larger single-day 36-hole tournament. The first international players competed in 1971. It was reduced to a 27-hole event in 1972 and 1973, before becoming a two-day 36 hole tournament from 1974.

Winners

Notes

References

External links
Kuzuha Public Golf Course – Tournament history 

Former Japan Golf Tour events
Defunct golf tournaments in Japan
Sport in Osaka Prefecture
Recurring sporting events established in 1965
Recurring sporting events disestablished in 1990